The 1893 William & Mary football team represented the College of William & Mary during the 1893 college football season.  In the fall of 1893, Charles L. Hepburn brought together the first official football team at William & Mary—the college's first organized athletic team. The 1893 team played three games, starting with the first contest in school history against a YMCA team from nearby Norfolk, Virginia.

Schedule

References

William and Mary
William & Mary Tribe football seasons
William and Mary football